The Fresno State Bulldogs baseball team represents Fresno State in NCAA Division I college baseball. Along with most other Fresno State athletic teams, the baseball team participates in the Mountain West Conference. The Bulldogs play their home games on campus at Pete Beiden Field, and they are currently coached by Ryan Overland.

Fresno State in the NCAA Tournament
The 2008 NCAA Division I College World Series Champions.
In one of the more improbable Cinderella stories in American sports history, the Bulldogs surmounted a daunting array of obstacles on their way to the NCAA title:
Prior to winning the 2008 tournament, Fresno State's only championship in a men's sport was in 1968, when the men's tennis team  won the national championship held in Fort Worth, Texas.
 Fresno State had previously won only two national championships in its school history, the 1968 NCAA College Division men's tennis championships and  the 1998 NCAA Women's College World Series.
 The Bulldogs entered the Western Athletic Conference tournament at 33–27; they would likely not have made the NCAA tournament without winning the WAC tournament, which they did.
 They were the #4 seed in their regional. Since only four teams play in each of 16 regionals, this is the equivalent of a team seeded #13 or lower in the NCAA basketball tournament. No #4 seed had advanced to the College World Series. By contrast, only one team #13 or lower seed has made the "Elite 8" of the men's basketball tournament, which is arguably equivalent to the eight-team College World Series.
 Six times in the NCAA tournament, including three times in the College World Series, they faced elimination with a loss. They won all six times.
 They won a total of 10 tournament games against six different teams ranked in the top 20. ESPN pointed out that in terms of the NCAA basketball tournament, Fresno State's run would be equivalent to a 13 seed beating a 4 seed in the first round, a 5 seed in the second round, a top seed in the Sweet 16, a second seed in the Elite 8, another top seed in the Final Four, and still another 2 seed for the championship.
 The Bulldogs' stellar underdog journey to the CWS Championship was nominated for an ESPY.
Fresno State's 30+ NCAA tournament appearances is good enough to rank in the top 10 all-time.

Notable alumni
Pat Doyle – Baseball coach.
Doug Fister – Pitcher, has been a fixture in the starting rotation for the Seattle Mariners, Detroit Tigers, Washington Nationals, and the Houston Astros since his MLB debut in 2009. Signed with the Los Angeles Angels of Anaheim in 2017. 
Mark Gardner – Pitcher, 12-year MLB veteran drafted in 1989 by the Montreal Expos, Kansas City Royals, Florida Marlins and finished his career with the San Francisco Giants. Has been on the Giants coaching staff as their bullpen coach since 2003.
Matt Garza – Pitcher, starting pitcher for the Milwaukee Brewers
Dan Gladden – outfielder with the Minnesota Twins for two World Series wins.
John Hoover – Set three career records and three Bulldogs single-season records, highlighted by his NCAA record of 42 career complete games and 19 complete games in a season, including 44 wins and 494 innings pitched in a career, and single-season marks of 18 wins and 205 strikeouts (Baltimore Orioles, first round, 25th pick, 1984 MLB draft).
Bobby Jones – Pitcher, selected by the Mets with the 36th pick in the 1st round of the 1991 amateur draft.
Aaron Judge – All-Star outfielder drafted by the New York Yankees in 2013, made his major league debut in 2016. 2017 American League Rookie of the Year, 2017 Home Run Derby Champion, broke Mark McGwire's MLB rookie home run record of 49, by hitting 52. American League single season home run leader passing Roger Maris’s mark of 61 with 62 in 2022.
Terry Pendleton – 3B, former All-Star and World Series Champion with the Atlanta Braves. Currently the 3B coach for the Braves. Was a 3-time Gold Glover (1987, 1989, 1992) and 1-time Batting Champ (1991 as well as 1-time League MVP (1991.
Dick Ruthven – Pitcher, drafted in 1973 by the Philadelphia Phillies he spent 13 years in MLB spending time with the Phillies, Atlanta Braves and Chicago Cubs. Was twice named an All-Star (1976, 1981) and won a World Series with the Phillies in 1980.
Jeff Weaver – Pitcher, 2006 World Series champion (St. Louis Cardinals). Drafted by the Detroit Tigers in the first round of the 1998 amateur draft.
Jimy Williams – 1999 American League Manager of the Year (Boston Red Sox), 1995 World Series champion (third-base coach, Atlanta Braves), and 2008 World Series champion (bench coach, Philadelphia Phillies).
 Austin Wynns - catcher for the San Francisco Giants
 Taylor Ward - Outfielder for the Los Angeles Angels, was teammates with Aaron Judge in 2013.

See also
List of NCAA Division I baseball programs
2008 Fresno State Bulldogs baseball team

References